Boughagumba  is a village development committee in Palpa District in the Lumbini Zone of southern Nepal. At the time of the 1991 Nepal census it had a population of 2811 people living in 499 individual households.

References

Populated places in Palpa District

ne:बौघागुम्बा